Barrow Heights is an unincorporated community located in Barrow County, Georgia, United States.

References

Unincorporated communities in Barrow County, Georgia
Unincorporated communities in Georgia (U.S. state)